The Toquima Cave, located on Pete's Summit in Humboldt-Toiyabe National Forest near Austin, Nevada, is a historic site having cultural importance to Native Americans, specifically to the Western Shoshone.
Also known as Pott's Cave, as Traditional Cultural Property 26-La1, and as Toiyabe N.F. Site TY-71, the cave and a  area was listed as an archeological site on the National Register of Historic Places in 2002.

Media views of the Toquima cave are available.
The cave entrance is fenced off and access to the cave is limited.

References 

Archaeological sites on the National Register of Historic Places in Nevada
Caves of Nevada
National Register of Historic Places in Lander County, Nevada
Nevada historical markers
Landforms of Lander County, Nevada
Austin, Nevada
Western Shoshone